Datuk  Krishnasamy Shiman (Tamil: ஷி. கிருஷ்ணசாமி) (5 October 1946 – 11 January 2008) was a state assemblyman for the Tenggaroh constituency from 1995 to 2008, belonging to the Malaysian Indian Congress (MIC). His assassination sparked grave security concerns among politicians.

See also
Politics of Malaysia

References

1946 births
2008 deaths
Malaysian people of Indian descent
Assassinated Malaysian politicians
Malaysian Indian Congress politicians
People murdered in Malaysia
Members of the Johor State Legislative Assembly
2008 murders in Malaysia